Vassilis C. Constantakopoulos ( Vassilis Constantakopoulos) 29 June 1935 - 25 January 2011) was, a Greek captain, shipowner and entrepreneur.

Personal life
Constantakopoulos was born in 1935 in the village of Diavolitsi, in Messinia, in southwest Peloponnese. After growing up in Messinia, he began a career on ships, gradually working his way up to master. In 1974, after 21 years in the industry, he established Costamare Shipping Company, which quickly expanded and today is one of the world's largest container shipping owners/operators, with 58 ships. He was widely known as Captain Vassilis.

Constantakopoulos was married to Carmen Kiritsi in 1964. They had three sons and seven grandchildren.

Career
Constantakopoulos was involved in other business activities in addition to shipping. He was the founder and president of Geohellas, an industrial minerals company involved in the mining, processing, and marketing of industrial minerals from deposits in the Greek prefectures of Grevena and Kozani.

Costamare
Today Costamare manages 58 ships and is a leading international owner of container ships, aggregating approximately 330,000 TEU, including 10 newbuild container ships on order and one second hand vessel to be delivered, ranging from about 1,000 TEUs to about 9,500 TEUs capacity.
In 2006, Costamare celebrated 32 years in the maritime business, employing about 2,000 people.

Costa Navarino
Constantakopoulos was the founder and president of TEMES S.A., developers of the new destination Costa Navarino in Messinia, where he was from. Costa Navarino was the prime sustainable destination in the Mediterranean. Constantakopoulos always wanted to preserve, promote and give back to his homeland.

His life's work was to revitalise one of Greece's most depressed regions with international luxury ecotourism. Costa Navarino, one of the most unspoiled and breathtaking seaside Mediterranean landscapes, is therefore a bold project to achieve this end: to offer luxurious yet sustainable options for people the world over to come and discover the unspoiled beauty of Captain Vassilis’ homeland while immersing themselves in the history of the region and offering employment opportunities to the local community.

Environment
Captain Vassilis become involved in the environmental movement in the early 1980s. He was co-founder of HELMEPA (Hellenic Marine Environment Protection Association). HELMEPA was founded in 1982 by Greek Shipowners and Greek Seafarers with the aim of promoting the protection of the sea environment. He was also a founding member of HELMEPA Junior and chaired both organizations.

HELMEPA Junior trains young people to act as the courier of environmental messages whilst also bringing the children closer to shipping and to show them potential future career options. Since 1993, more than 45,000 children aged 6 to 13 years old, and 1,800 teachers, have participated all over Greece. In 1998 HELMEPA Junior was awarded the UNEP (United Nations Environment Programme) Global 500 prize.

Charity and awards
Constantakopoulos was a benefactor to several causes in Greece and other countries. In 2000, Constantakopoulos and his wife founded the Hellenic Studies Centre at Peking University. 
 
Constantakopoulos served on the Boards of Directors of numerous Greek and international organizations in the maritime and other fields and received awards from the Academy of Athens, the European Union and several cities and chambers for his activities.

Death
Constantakopoulos died on January 25, 2011, at the age of 76.

References

External links

1935 births
2011 deaths
Greek environmentalists
Greek philanthropists
Greek businesspeople in shipping
People from Messenia
20th-century philanthropists